First Blood is a 1972 American action-thriller novel by David Morrell about a troubled homeless Vietnam War veteran, known only by his last name of Rambo, who wages a brutal one-man war against local and state police in Kentucky. It was adapted into the 1982 film First Blood starring Sylvester Stallone, which ended up spawning an entire media franchise around the Rambo character.

Plot

The story centers around a homeless Vietnam veteran known only by his last name, Rambo. He wanders into Madison, a town in Basalt County, Kentucky, and is quickly intercepted by the local police chief, Wilfred Teasle, who drives him to the town limits and orders him to stay out. When Rambo repeatedly returns, Teasle finally arrests him on charges of vagrancy and resisting arrest and gets permission to hold him for 35 days in jail. Kept inside a claustrophobia-inducing cell, Rambo experiences a flashback to his days as a prisoner of war in Vietnam, and he attacks the police as they attempt to forcibly cut his hair and shave him.  Rambo forces his way out, killing an officer in the process, steals a motorcycle, and hides in the nearby mountains.

Teasle, not wanting the state police to capture Rambo before he does, gets a helicopter pilot to search the woods and organizes a posse consisting of himself, his officers, and Orval Kellerman, an experienced hunter with a pack of highly trained dogs, to hunt Rambo down. Meanwhile, Rambo stumbles across an illegal still and persuades the moonshiners operating it to provide him with clothes and food; he also talks them into giving him a lever-action rifle. The posse catches up with Rambo, who is cornered by the helicopter and fires on it in self-defense; the pilot panics and loses control, causing the chopper to crash and explode. When the posse arrives, Rambo shoots two of Kellerman's dogs; the frightened animals leap off a cliff, taking an officer with them, and Kellerman is fatally wounded when he goes to check on them.

After Teasle's officers start firing wildly and waste most of their ammunition trying to kill Rambo, several desert their posts and try to make their way back to town as a violent cloudburst stirs up. Rambo obtains a hunting knife, canteen, and pistol, ambushing the fleeing officers and killing them one by one until only Teasle remains. The chief loses his gun, but Rambo's caution, the rain, and Teasle's own determination not to die enables him to escape with his life. He is rescued by the state police and, once his condition is stabilized, gets the National Guard to send several detachments of troops to assist with the manhunt.

It is eventually revealed to Teasle that Rambo was a member of an elite Green Beret unit in Vietnam; he has extensive experience in guerrilla warfare and survival tactics and received the Medal of Honor. Since his discharge from the Army, he has been unable to hold down a job, thus forcing him to live as a drifter. Teasle, bitter over the deaths of his men but also finding himself sympathetic to Rambo's plight, insists on helping capture him even though his health is beginning to deteriorate from the injuries he suffered while pursuing Rambo. Rambo also finds himself torn between his instinct to keep fighting and his sense of self-preservation; he refuses to take the opportunity to escape because the rush of battle is simply too much for him to resist.

Teasle meets Colonel Sam Trautman, the director of the Green Beret program; Trautman helps reorganize the National Guard units to better track Rambo, who is struggling with his wounds and starving. Two civilians hunting him alert the National Guard to his presence before being killed, and Rambo seals himself inside an abandoned mine, where he is badly bitten and scratched by a bat colony while looking for a way out. Teasle finally collapses and is taken back to town, where he wakes up in his office after having a vision that reveals where Rambo is headed next: Madison. Having stolen a police car and a supply of dynamite, Rambo starts blowing up most of the town, including the police headquarters, and sets fire to two gas stations. 
 
Teasle, anticipating his path, manages to surprise Rambo and shoots him in the chest, but is himself wounded in the stomach by a return shot. Rambo flees town, and Teasle follows. Both men are essentially dying by this point; the only thing keeping them alive is a mix of pride and a desire to justify their actions. As Trautman and the National Guard arrive, Rambo makes his way out to a shed, where he prepares to take his own life using his last stick of dynamite. Seeing Teasle walking towards him and deciding that it would be better to die fighting, Rambo fires at him to get his attention, but to his surprise and disappointment, Teasle is hit and falls over. For a moment, Rambo reflects on how he had missed his chance of a decent death because he is now too weak to light the fuse, then suddenly feels the explosion he had expected — but in the head, not the stomach. Rambo dies, satisfied that he has come to a fitting end. Trautman returns to the dying Teasle and tells him that he managed to finish off Rambo with a shotgun. Teasle relaxes, experiences a moment of affection for Rambo, and then dies.

Background
Morrell stated he was inspired to write the novel by hearing about the experiences of his students who had fought in Vietnam. Morrell said "When I started First Blood back in 1968, I was deeply influenced by Geoffrey Household's Rogue Male." The character's name was derived in part from the Rambo apple, a supply of which his wife brought home while he was trying to come up with a suitable name for his character. One of the inspirations for Rambo was World War II hero Audie Murphy, in particular his suffering from untreated post-traumatic stress disorder in his post-war years. Madison, Kentucky was modeled after Bellefonte, Pennsylvania.

Reception
John Skow of Time described the book as "carnography", though he remarked that the technical aspects of it are done well.

The book has been translated into 26 languages.

Film adaptation

Cuban-Italian actor Tomas Milian read First Blood soon after its release and wanted to star in an adaptation of it; however, he was unsuccessful in persuading Italian producers to support the project. Still, he used "Rambo" as the name of his character, an ex-cop, in the 1975 film Syndicate Sadists.

In 1972, Morrell sold the film rights to First Blood to Columbia Pictures, who in turn sold them to Warner Bros. The film languished in development hell for ten years, with the story passing through three companies and eighteen screenplays. Finally, Andrew G. Vajna and Mario Kassar, two film distributors looking to become producers, obtained the film rights. Sylvester Stallone was cast in the lead role, due to the star power he had from the films Rocky and Rocky II. Stallone used his clout to force changes to the script to make Rambo a more sympathetic character, including having Rambo not directly kill any police or national guardsmen (in the novel, he kills many), and having him survive at the end instead of dying as he does in the book. The novel also differs from the film in that, instead of Trautman personally training and leading Rambo in Vietnam, Trautman is mentioned as the commander of the school where he trained and Rambo barely remembers him. Rambo also expresses anger that Trautman would turn on one of his own after hearing that Trautman is working with the police to capture him.

Rambo, whose first name is not specified in the novel, was given the first name "John" for the film as a reference to the song "When Johnny Comes Marching Home".

The film, First Blood, was a major success, earning $125 million on a $15 million budget, and spawning an entire Rambo franchise.

David Morrell, despite killing Rambo in the original novel, wrote the novelization for Rambo: First Blood Part II, and explained that he was bringing the character back to life because of the success of the movie.

References

Further reading
Stiffed by Susan Faludi (1999). Chapter 7 (pp. 359–406) offers a fuller treatment of the genesis and metamorphosis of First Blood from book to theater, including the screenplay's radical and reactionary swings in development and the alternate movie ending.

1972 American novels
Rambo (franchise)
American adventure novels
American thriller novels
Novels set during the Vietnam War
Novels set in Kentucky
American novels adapted into films